Blumberg is a municipality situated in the Schwarzwald-Baar region of Baden-Württemberg, Germany.   Nineteen kilometres (11.8 miles) south of Donaueschingen, it lies between the southern edge of the Schwarzwald, the Black Forest, the border with Switzerland’s Canton of Schaffhausen, and Lake Constance.

History

The town of Blumberg is in the region where the ancient source for the Danube is situated, the former glacial valley between Eichberg and Buchberg, and its official origins date from the 13th Century with the Masters of Blumberg first mentioned in 1260.

However one of the oldest settlements, the Steppacher Hof, was already documented in the 12th century, and the town itself is believed to have originated long before that time as archaeological finds have  shown the area was inhabited during the Stone Age.

The Wutach is a 90km long tributary of the River Rhine that changes name twice as it passes through the southern Black Forest, and Blumberg was established in the Wutach valley close to the ancient Wutachschlucht. The spectacular 'Wutach Gorge', now a nature reserve and conservation area known as the Grand-Canyon des Schwarzwaldes.

Built above the town in the Middle Ages Blumberg castle contributed significantly towards the development of the surrounding settlements, and from 1559, while ruled by the princely Fuerstenberg family who from 1283 until 2004 also were owners of a brewery, Blumberg had grown enough in importance to be elevated from Städtle (town) to a 'city'.

During the Thirty Years' War, 1618–1648, the castle was destroyed but after 1648, thanks to its Doggererz iron ore reserves, the town experienced a short lived expansion.

Doggererz mine was reopened and the ore was extracted once again from 1934 to 1942, the time of the National Socialist German Workers' Party, Nazi Germany. In Nazi Germany itself and throughout German-occupied Europe the use of Forced labour under German rule during World War II was widespread, and Blumberg has a memorial honoring these workers as also in Doggererz AG Zwangsarbeiter were used as miners.

The population in what had been until then a predominantly agricultural town increased dramatically. By 1945 it had risen from the 700 of 1935 to 7,000.

After World War II in 1945 the town and surrounding region were occupied by French forces as part of South Baden, as the previous states of Baden and Württemberg had been divided into US and French occupation zones.

Blumberg expanded during the 1950s as various industrial works became established in the district and now has around 10.800 inhabitants, while the town is also a thriving tourist area.

Nevertheless, Blumberg has retained a small town sense of community and traditional character, with time-honored seasonal festivities, customs, street parties, and parades such as those for Swabian–Alemannic Fastnacht, Carnival, continuing to take place.

Small specialized local stores that go back generations still exist, and for a few weeks multi-colored, decorated, and filled carnival doughnuts can be found at artisanal bakers, where handmade bread, cake and cookie specialties are freshly baked daily. While from the early hours of the morning master butchers, Metzger, begin producing the region's traditionally seasoned cold cuts, sausages, and terrines as well as fresh meat and Silesian specialties from what is now mainly Poland.

Tourism

Blumberg is set in the center of one of the most scenically beautiful areas of Germany, with everything from castles, nature parks, forests, lakes and mountains, to skiing, sailing, spas and tourist routes. While close by are historic cities filled with culture as well as endless shopping possibilities, and Switzerland is just minutes away.

It is also the starting point for the legendary Sauschwänzlebahn, The Pigtail Line, The Wutach Valley Railway. An old-fashioned steam locomotive, with original carriages, which runs on a railway line that curves and loops around Blumberg like a curled pigtail. It is run as a railway museum and travels on elevated tracks across the countryside throughout the summer months. This had to take a break from November to March 2013 and 2014 as over 200 endangered Barbastella bats had set up their winter quarters in the six railway tunnels, and trains would have disturbed the animals.

Geography

Districts
The municipality of Blumberg is made up of the districts of Blumberg Achdorf, Blumberg, Epfenhofen, Fützen, Hondingen, Kommingen, Nordhalden, Riedböhringen and Riedöschingen, and, with the exception of Blumberg itself, each of these has its own district council, which is the custom in Baden-Württemberg.

The village of Achdorf is the only one remaining of the original settlements alongside the river Wutach, which lies within scenic Wutachschlucht, the 30km long pre-historic Danube Wutachschlucht gorge.

Religion

Even after the Reformation the Blumberg region remained predominantly Roman Catholic, and produced a Cardinal, Curial Cardinal Augustin Bea.   Born the son of a carpenter on May 28, 1881 in Riedböhringen near Donaueschingen, he died in Rome on the 16th of November, 1968.  A museum has been created in the house where his birth took place, and this can be visited by appointment.

Today the area has four Roman Catholic parishes, two parishes of the "Old Catholic Church" that follows Ultrajectine theology, as well as a Protestant and a New Apostolic Church.

Associated with Blumberg

Sophie Scholl one of the founders of the White Rose, a non-violent Anti-Nazi resistance student group from the University of Munich, lived in Blumberg for six months at the beginning of World War II, while working for the Reichsarbeitsdienst, State Labor Service, as an 'Arbeitsmaiden', a female worker.

In 1940 she helped at a Protestant crèche in Blumberg. This had been set up to care for children of women forcibly recruited to work, in jobs considered important for the war effort, and in her memory, the 'Kindergarten Sophie-Scholl' was opened on February 28, 1992.

Executed for treason on February 22, 1943, she, and the group to which she belonged, have been the subject of many books and films.

Twinned Cities

 Valdoie, Franche-Comté, northeastern France.
 Kunszentmiklós, Bács-Kiskun County, southern Hungary.

Personalities 

 Gustav Häusler (1894-1964), a native of Hohenstaufen, a native of Stühlingen
 Augustin Cardinal Bea (1881-1968), Roman Catholic Cardinal
 Herbert Baumann (1927-1990), sculptor
 Dieter Koulmann (1939-1979), German footballer

References

External links

 Blumberg Tourist Office(English)
 Blumberg: Bilder & Ortsgeschichte 

Towns in Baden-Württemberg
Schwarzwald-Baar-Kreis